The Gulf Plains, an interim Australian bioregion (IBRA), is located in the Northern Territory and Queensland, comprising . It is one of 89 such bioregions defined in Australia, with 419 subregions as of IBRA version 7, compared with the 85 bioregions and 403 subregions described in IBRA6.1.

The code for the bioregion is GUP.

See also

Geography of Australia

References

Further reading
 Thackway, R and I D Cresswell (1995) An interim biogeographic regionalisation for Australia : a framework for setting priorities in the National Reserves System Cooperative Program Version 4.0 Canberra : Australian Nature Conservation Agency, Reserve Systems Unit, 1995. 

Carpentaria tropical savanna
IBRA regions